Many countries, cities or juggling clubs hold their own annual juggling convention or juggling festivals. These are the backbone of the juggling scene, the events that regularly bring jugglers from a wide area together to socialize. The attendance of a convention can be anything from a few dozen to a few thousand people.

Typical activities 

The principal focus of most juggling conventions is the main hall - where any participant can juggle freely, share and learn tricks, and try out multi-person passing patterns. Additionally, more formal "workshops" are often organized, in which expert jugglers work with small groups on specific skills and techniques. Most Juggling Conventions will also include a big show (open to the general public), competitions and juggling games. Many juggling conventions host some kind of Renegade Show, an open stage where anyone can, at short notice, get up and perform just about anything.

The Juggling Edge maintains a searchable database of past and upcoming juggling festivals and events.

Types of juggling conventions 

Conventions can be split into three distinct types, though all call themselves "Juggling Conventions":

"Festival"

These last three to ten days and can attract between 150 and 5,500 people. Most attendees camp, pitching tents within the convention site, and this is covered by the cost of attendance. Onsite there are usually food tents, bar tents, various sports halls or large bigtops for juggling space. During the day there can be shows, workshops, games, parades and exhibitions. Every night there is entertainment provided in the forms of professional shows, open stages, late night stages, live music, parties and more. The largest festival style conventions are held in Europe.

Some notable festival style conventions are:
The European Juggling Convention - The world's largest convention is held in a different European country each year. The first EJC was held in 1978 in Brighton, England and attracted 11 jugglers from five different countries (England, Ireland, Scotland, Germany, USA). The convention lasts 7 to 9 days. In 2011 it was held in Munich, Germany and attracted over 7200 jugglers from all over the world, making it the biggest EJC since the start of this convention. The 2023 festival will take place in Gormanston, Ireland.
The British Juggling Convention - a 5-7 day juggling convention in the UK, now attracts between 750 and 1,000 each year, held in the Easter school holiday.
 The French Juggling Convention (CFJ) is in a different city each year organised by one of the associations that organises a local juggling convention, supported by the Association Française de Jonglerie (AFJ), and runs for about a week.
Israeli Juggling Convention - runs for 5 days over the Passover holiday and is held at Gan HaShlosha National Park in the north of Israel. It attracts between 1200-1400 members of the public including many jugglers. 
Berlin Juggling Convention - Germany's largest juggling convention, about 600-800 people attend each year.
Circulation - A 3-5 day juggling festival in New Zealand currently in its fifth year of operation attended by up to 300 people.
The Dutch Juggling Convention - a 4-day convention run each year in a different city in the Netherlands over the ascension day holiday and is attended by about 500 jugglers.
Broxford (formerly The Bristol Juggling and Circus Skills Convention) - a 9-day convention held in southern England. Attended by about 300 people each year.
The Bungay Balls Up - a 10-day convention held in Suffolk, UK.
The Turkish Juggling Convention - A convention of 7 days held in Sundance-Antalya and attended by more than 300 people.
The Swedish Juggling Convention - A four-day convention held over the Easter holiday.
Brianza Juggling Convention - Imbersago (MI), Italy - a four-day convention held over the long weekend in May each year attended by about 1000 people.
Dali Flow Fest - Dali City, Yunnan, China - a seven-day convention held on first week of third moon of Chinese calendar and attended by about 150 people.

"Conference" 
These are held in city center hotels or conference centers. They are invariably in North America and slightly more expensive than the European Juggling Convention. Camping is only rarely an option, as most are held in hotel convention centers. Notable conference-style conventions are :

 The IJA Summer Festival - The first and longest running juggling convention. It is held in a different city each year, with the largest attendance in the 1990s of up to 1,300 jugglers. In 2014 it was held in West Lafayette, Indiana, and attracted  over 500 jugglers.
 The Japan Juggling Festival (JJF) is an annual event held in a different city each year since 1999. Hosted by the Japan Juggling Association. activities at this festival include workshops, shows, and competitions.
 The World Juggling Federation Convention - the first WJF convention was held in Las Vegas in December 2004 and attracted 150-200 jugglers. More recent WJF conventions have been televised for ESPN.

"One Day" 
Small, regional conventions that last up to two or three days. These usually attract between 25 and 250 people, have workshops throughout the day and a show in the evening of the main day. At these conventions accommodation and food is not normally provided. They are usually held in sports centres, schools or universities. Some notable one day conventions are:
 Chocfest - in York, UK
 Leeds Juggling Festival - Leeds, UK
 Camvention - Cambridge, UK

The four largest conventions 

The most well attended convention is the European Juggling Convention (EJC), along with the British Juggling Convention (BJC), the Israeli Juggling Convention (IJC), and the IJA Festival (IJA). They all take place annually.

The BJC occurs every spring, the IJC is staged over Passover, and the EJC and IJA are summer festivals. The BJC takes place in Britain, the IJC in Israel, and the EJC in Europe, as one might expect, but the IJA Festival has so far proven to be an exclusively North American event, despite it being the principal date in the calendar of the International Jugglers' Association.

Dates and locations of the four largest festivals

Notes

References